The 2018 Delaware State Hornets football team represented Delaware State University in the 2018 NCAA Division I FCS football season. They were led by first-year head coach Rod Milstead and played their home games at Alumni Stadium. They were a member of the Mid-Eastern Athletic Conference (MEAC). They finished the season 3–8, 2–5 in MEAC play to finish in a tie for eighth place.

Previous season
The Hornets finished the 2017 season 2–9, 2–6 in MEAC play to finish in a three-way tie for eighth place.

On November 19, it was announced that head coach Kenny Carter's contract would not be renewed. He finished at Delaware State with a three-year record of 3–30.

Preseason

MEAC preseason poll
In a vote of the MEAC head coaches and sports information directors, the Hornets were picked to finish in last place.

Preseason All-MEAC Teams
The Hornets had four players selected to the preseason all-MEAC teams.

Offense

2nd team

Brycen Alleyne – RB

Defense

1st team

Brian Cavicante – LB

Keyjuan Selby – DB

Special teams

1st team

Fidel Romo-Martinez – P

Schedule

 Source: Schedule

Game summaries

at Buffalo

at Saint Francis (PA)

at Western Michigan

at Norfolk State

North Carolina A&T

at Howard

at South Carolina State

Savannah State

at Morgan State

Virginia–Lynchburg

Coaching staff

References

Delaware State
Delaware State Hornets football seasons
Delaware State Hornets football